Sabrina No Heaven is an album by Thee Michelle Gun Elephant, released in 2003.

Track listing
 チェルシー - (Chelsea) - 7:38 
 ミッドナイト・クラクション・ベイビー - (Midnight Klaxon Baby) - 3:39 
 デッドマンズ・ギャラクシー・デイズ - (Deadman's Galaxy Days) - 3:52 
 水色の水 - (Turquoise Water) - 6:40 
 "Pink" - 4:40
 夜が終わる（Instrumental） - (Night is Over) - 5:19

(Brackets are English translations)

References 

Thee Michelle Gun Elephant albums
2003 albums